WWCF is an Adult Album Alternative formatted broadcast radio station licensed to McConnellsburg, Pennsylvania, serving Eastern Fulton County and Western Franklin County in Pennsylvania.  WWCF is owned and operated by Cove Mountain Educational Broadcasting, Inc.

References

External links
 WWCF Radio 88.7 Online
 

2005 establishments in Pennsylvania
Adult album alternative radio stations in the United States
Radio stations established in 2005
WCF
Fulton County, Pennsylvania